The 5th Regiment of Airborne Field Artillery, was an airborne artillery unit of the French Army from 1946 to 1949. The divisionary artillery regiment of the 25th Airborne Division, the regiment was heir to the 5th Artillery Regiment of France. Elements passed to the 20th Light Parachute Artillery Regiment, then to the 8th Artillery Regiment.

Founded in 1946 under the designation of 5e R.A.P, the regiment would eventually bear the designation of R.A.C.A.P.

The regiment was composed of batteries equipped with diverse materials (wheeled cannon type 75mm, British 88mm, the U.S. cannon type 37mm anti-tank and the U.S. cannon type 75mmm) along with other anti-aircraft type equipments.

See also 
List of French paratrooper units
Jean de Lattre de Tassigny
35th Parachute Artillery Regiment

References

Airborne,05
Military units and formations established in 1946
05
Military units and formations disestablished in 1949